Mir Dast,  (3 December 1874 – 19 January 1945) was an Indian soldier and a recipient of the Victoria Cross for action during the First World War, the highest award for gallantry in the face of the enemy that can be awarded to British and Commonwealth forces.

Personal data
Mir Dast was a Pashtun from Afridi tribe and was born on 3 December 1874 to a Muslim family in the Maidan valley, Tirah, of what is now Pakistan. Mir Dast enlisted in the British Indian Army in December 1894. He served in the North-West Frontier and Waziristan prior to the First World War, and was promoted to the rank of jemadar in March 1909.

Victoria Cross

During the First World War Dast was a jemadar in the 55th Coke's Rifles (Frontier Force), British Indian Army, attached to the 57th Wilde's Rifles (Frontier Force) when he performed the service for which he was awarded the Victoria Cross during the Second Battle of Ypres.

On 26 April 1915 at Ypres, Belgium, Jemadar Mir Dast led his platoon with great gallantry during a German counter-attack, and afterwards collected various parties of the regiment (when no British officers were left) and kept them under his command until the retirement was ordered. He also displayed remarkable courage that day in helping to carry eight British and Indian Officers into safety, while exposed to very heavy fire which left Dast wounded.

Dast was subsequently sent for treatment in the Royal Pavilion, Brighton where he received his medal from King George V. His was the fourth VC awarded to an Indian since Indians had become eligible for the award in 1911.

Later life and legacy
Dast was retired from active service in 1917 with the rank of subedar. He died on 19 January 1945 at Shagi Hindkyan Village, Tehsil, Peshawar, and was buried at Warsak Road Cemetery, Shagi Hindkyan, Federally Administered Tribal Areas, Pakistan.

Today a monument stands at the Memorial Gates at Hyde Park Corner in London to commemorate the VCs of Indian heritage, including Mir Dast.

A blue plaque was erected in May 2016 in honour of Mir Dast next to the Indian Gate at Royal Pavilion Gardens in Brighton.

References

External links
Mir Dast
ODNB entry by David Omissi

1874 births
1945 deaths
British Indian Army officers
Indian World War I recipients of the Victoria Cross
People from Khyber District
Recipients of the Cross of St. George
Recipients of the Indian Order of Merit